Larry Marshall (born April 3, 1943) is an American actor and singer. He is known for his work in musical theatre and film.

Early life and education
Marshall was born in 1944 in Spartanburg, South Carolina, and raised in South Carolina and New York. As a child, he created a doo-wop group called the Dell Chords with other kids in the neighborhood. He later studied at Fordham University, Xavier University, and the New England Conservatory of Music.

Career
During junior year at the New England Conservatory, Marshall won a chorus role in Porgy and Bess, which he toured internationally. After graduation, he continued to perform in the opera, touring nationally and on Broadway, eventually earning Tony and Drama Desk award nominations for his portrayal of Sportin' Life. He continued to play this role into the 1990s. Marshall's other Broadway appearances include Two Gentlemen of Verona, The Full Monty, and The Color Purple. He also performed in the New York Shakespeare Festival.

Marshall's film roles include Cab Calloway in The Cotton Club and Simon Zealotes in Jesus Christ Superstar. Calloway praised Marshall's portrayal of him in The Cotton Club. In the 2015 documentary Superstars, Marshall reunited with fellow Jesus Christ Superstar cast members, including Ted Neeley (who produced the documentary), Yvonne Elliman, and Josh Mostel.

Personal life

Larry lives on Staten Island, in New York City, with his long-time partner, Jeannine Otis.

Theatrical performances (selected)

Filmography (selected)

References

External links
 Larry Marshall's official website
 
 

1944 births
American male stage actors
African-American male actors
20th-century African-American male singers
American male singers
Living people
Male actors from New York City
Musicians from Spartanburg, South Carolina
New England Conservatory alumni
21st-century African-American people